Syndication may refer to:

 Broadcast syndication, of programs to other networks
 Print syndication, of printed material to other publishers
 Web syndication, of web feeds to other sites
 Search syndication, of keyword searches
 Syndicated loan, made by a group of banks
 Really Simple Syndication, Web news feeds

See also
 Syndic
 Syndicate
 Syndicate (disambiguation)
 Wikipedia:Syndication